Iriome González González (born 22 June 1987), known simply as Iriome, is a Spanish former professional footballer who played as a midfielder.

He amassed Segunda División totals of 416 matches and 34 goals over 15 seasons, mainly in service of Lugo (eight years) and Tenerife (four).

Club career
Born in Icod de los Vinos, Santa Cruz de Tenerife, Canary Islands, Iriome was a product of CD Tenerife's youth system and made his first-team debut in 2006–07, in the Segunda División; aged 19, he managed to play 20 matches during the season and score four goals, his first appearance in the competition being on 14 January 2007 in a 0–0 away draw against UD Salamanca. His first goal came 14 days later, as he contributed to a 2–1 home win over UD Almería.

After featuring rarely in the 2008–09 campaign as the club returned to La Liga after seven years (only 12 appearances out of 42), Iriome signed with another side in the second tier, SD Huesca, on loan. He continued to compete in that league for several seasons, with Villarreal CF B, CD Mirandés and CD Lugo.

International career
Iriome represented Spain at the 2007 FIFA U-20 World Cup.

References

External links

1987 births
Living people
People from Icod de los Vinos
Sportspeople from the Province of Santa Cruz de Tenerife
Spanish footballers
Footballers from the Canary Islands
Association football midfielders
Segunda División players
Segunda División B players
Tercera División players
CD Tenerife B players
CD Tenerife players
SD Huesca footballers
Villarreal CF B players
CD Mirandés footballers
CD Lugo players
Spain youth international footballers